The Socialist Party of the Valencian Country (PSPV–PSOE) is a social-democratic political party in the Valencian Community, and is a regional branch of the national Spanish Socialist Workers' Party (PSOE).

The PSPV was originally a small nationalist and leftist Valencian party, mostly confined to the academic world within the University of Valencia. In 1978, they decided to merge with the much larger national PSOE, to which they integrated. Their name remains in the name of the Valencian branch of the PSOE, officially called PSPV-PSOE, even though it is usually reduced to PSOE only by the party itself. This Valencian branch of the PSOE, unlike their Catalan counterpart, does not have a record of having acted independently from the national executive of the Spanish-wide PSOE.

History
The PSPV-PSOE was the ruling party in the Valencian Country from 1983 through 1995. The People's Party (PP) won the elections since 1995 until 2015, when the PSPV-PSOE won the elections and ended the 20 year tenure of the PP. The PSPV-PSOE remains the main opposition party of the PP from 1995 to date.

In their general meeting held in September 2008, the party was scheduled to officially drop the PSPV line in their name and change it to PSCV to adjust it to the official name of the territory (Comunitat Valenciana, CV) but, eventually, this proposal was discarded and the name was not changed. However, talk of a name change for the party keeps lingering on, as its new leader is said to support a different name in order to be in synch with the current Valencian situation. (for further information, see Names of the Valencian Community)

Electoral performance

Corts Valencianes

Cortes Generales

European Parliament

References

1978 establishments in Spain
Valencia
Political parties in the Valencian Community
Political parties established in 1978
Social democratic parties in Spain